Hinda may refer to:

Hinda (beetle), a genus of ladybird beetles
Hinda Hicks, Tunisian-born British singer
Hinda Miller (born 1950), member of the Vermont State Senate
Hinda Wassau (1906-1980), striptease and burlesque star
a variant spelling of Hind bint Utbah, 6th-7th-century Arab woman associated with Muhammed
Hinda, Republic of the Congo, a small town

See also
Hindås, a locality in Sweden